Dischidia is a genus of plants in the “dog-bane” family Apocynaceae, collectively known as the “milkweeds” (true perennial milkweeds in the Apocynaceae are found in the genus Asclepias). They are epiphytes, native to tropical areas of China, India as well as Bhutan’s southern borders, wherever minimal frost occurs. Additionally, they are known from most areas of Indo-China,  including forested areas of Myanmar, Thailand, Vietnam, Cambodia, Laos, and some parts of Malaysia and Singapore.

Description

Overview 
Dischidia are closely related to their sister-genus Hoya, whose range they overlap in some regions. Unlike Hoya, the genus Dischidia is poorly-known and has not been studied as closely.

Habitat 
Most Dischidia grow in arboreal ant nests, of various species, and several have developed a symbiotic relationship with the insects. The plants have even evolved modified leaves to provide the ants housing and/or storage, in exchange for pollination of their blooms. Of these symbiotic adaptations, there are two types of modification to the leaves:

Foliage 
Three species are known to have evolved  bullate leaves (hollow, bulbous structures housing the plant’s root); Dischidia complex Griff, Dischidia major (Vahl) Merr. and Dischidia vidalii Becc. Both produce normal leaves (cordate in shape), in addition to the bullate ones. These bullate leaves are formed when the outer margins of a leaf stop growing, while the center of the leaf continues to grow. As time progresses, the leaf margins curl under (to close the gap), which creates a small hole.

A number of species develop imbricate leaves, which adhere tightly to the growing surface. The underside of the leaf has a space which is filled with roots, and that the ants take advantage of, such as  Dischidia major, Dischidia astephana, Dischidia imbricata and Dischidia platyphylla, including many more. Plants with this type of growth habit are referred to as shingling plants, as their leaves will tend to overlap  in a row as they climb up a tree, wall, or rock face, giving the appearance of tiles or roof shingles. This adaptation is evident in many other plant species, especially in the family Araceae, including Monstera dubia, some species of Epipremnum, Rhaphidophora hayi, R. cryptantha, and Scindapsus. Other clear examples of shingling can be found with the growth habits of English ivy, Marcgravia, and Ficus pumila (creeping fig).

Uses

Cultivation 
A few of the species are in widespread cultivation, and can be kept as houseplants in temperate regions, or in protected conditions. At some point, between the years 2015-2020, a few species and cultivars became known via the houseplant trade, especially D. ovata, D. nummularia, and D. ioantha, along with several more. Awareness of the genus, as well as its overall popularity, has steadily increased among tropical plant growers and enthusiasts.

Species

Species moved to other genera
 Dischidia chinghungensis, syn of Hoya chinghungensis 
 Dischidia papuana, syn of  Dischidiopsis papuana 
 Dischidia yunnanensis, syn of  Biondia yunnanensis

Species with Nomen nudum
 Dischidia diphylla Elmer

References

Dischidia
Apocynaceae genera
Epiphytes
Myrmecophytes